Karl Postl (1769–1818) was an Austrian painter who had a career in Prague during the early 19th century.  An instructor at the Prague Academy, he also served as a scene painter for the Estates Theatre.  Most of his work was in the field of graphic design, but a few paintings by his hand exist; some are in the collection of the National Gallery in Prague. Antonín Mánes was his main pupil.

Life 

Karl was born into a count's family, Paar in Bechyni. He studied painting and graphic design at the Academy in Vienna. From the late 18th century, he set up a studio in Prague. He was promoted as the first director of drawing at the Academy by Czech patrons, but preference was given to Josef Bergler. From 1806 to 1817, that is, until his untimely death, he taught landscape painting and graphic vista at the Academy in Prague. His students included Josef Šembera, Vincenc Morstadt, Joseph Frederick Zwettler and Antonin Manes, the latter also became successor at the Academy. Then from 1804, Postl worked as a theatrical scene painter at the Estates Theatre, where he was later replaced by Antonin Machek.

He died prematurely of pulmonary tuberculosis. He is buried at the Olšany Cemetery in Prague.

Work 

His work blends classicism and romanticism patterns both Viennese and French ( inspired by the likes of Claude Lorrain and Nicolas Poussin ). His landscape work was generally focused on panoramic views of Prague, which were often presented in graphic albums. He was also a skilled portraitist. He also participated in the creation of postcards for some spa towns . His paintings are shown primarily in the collections of the National Gallery and the Museum of Prague.

List of paintings 

 New Avenues and the Church. Ursuline in Prague, 1800 (Museum of the City of Prague)
 Panorama of Vienna, 1804
 Panorama of Prague From Tower Waterworks
 Monastery of St. Anny Old Town
 The Game of Chase in Prague
 Royal Deer Park and Governor's Summer House, 1810 (Museum of the City of Prague)
 View of the Czech Krumlov
 Four Daytime Scapes (National Gallery)
 Forest Landscape (National Gallery)
 Portrait Postlová Wives Sewing, (National Gallery)
 Allegory of Friendship and Gratitude, shooting target, 1812 (Museum of the City of Prague)

References
Naděžda Blažíčková-Horová, ed. 19th-Century Art in Bohema: (1790-1910) - Painting, Sculpture, Decorative Arts.  Prague; National Gallery in Prague, 2009.

External links

1769 births
1818 deaths
18th-century Austrian painters
18th-century Austrian male artists
Austrian male painters
19th-century Austrian painters
19th-century Austrian male artists
Austrian graphic designers
Czech painters
Czech male painters
Czech graphic designers
Czech scenic designers
19th-century deaths from tuberculosis
Tuberculosis deaths in the Czech Republic